The Iris N. Spencer Poetry Awards are three awards administered by the West Chester University Poetry Center and are given annually during the West Chester University Poetry Conference "to recognize the important role of arts and letters in American life." The Iris N. Spencer Poetry Awards were named by Kean W. Spencer, who provided the initial endowment, after his mother.

History
In 2005, the creation of the Iris N. Spencer Poetry Awards was announced at the WCU Poetry Conference. Kean W. Spencer provided the initial endowment of $250,000. Though not a poet himself, Spencer did win the prestigious Hopwood Award for poetry from the University of Michigan as a young man. The following year, the original two awards—the Donald Justice Poetry Prize and the Iris N. Spencer Undergraduate Poetry Award—were given for the first time.

Later on, the Myong Cha Son Haiku Award was added and presented for the first time in 2007.

Donald Justice Poetry Prize

Given annually since 2006 to one poet for an unpublished book-length manuscript of poetry, the award includes $1500, publication, and a scholarship to the West Chester University Poetry Conference. The prize is named after poet Donald Justice.

Undergraduate awards
These awards are open to all undergraduates who are enrolled in either a college or university. In 2012, both prizes went national. (Previously, the competition was only open to students in the Delaware Valley of Pennsylvania.)

Iris N. Spencer Undergraduate Poetry Award
Given annually since 2006 for an original poem composed in the traditional modes of meter, rhyme and form to one winner and one runner-up, the Iris N. Spencer Undergraduate Poetry Award includes $1500 and $500 respectively as well as an opportunity for publication for both.

The first place award was increased to $1500 from $1000 in 2012.

The following are the winners of the Iris N. Spencer Undergraduate Award:
2006  William Welsh
2007  Luke Stromberg
2008  Robert Whitehead
2009  Molly O'Neill
2010  Emily Yoon
2011  Jule Coppa
2012  Miranda Stinson
2013  Stephen Rodriguez
2014  
2015  
2016  Rachel Ann Girty

The runners-up were:
2006 
2007 
2008 
2009  Frances Wright
2010  Julie Price
2011  
2012  Erin Jones
2013  Laura Grothaus

Myong Cha Son Haiku Award
Given annually since 2007 for an original unpublished haiku, the Myong Cha Son Haiku Award includes $1500 prize for one winner and a $500 prize for a runner-up and an opportunity for publication in a national literary journal for both. This award was created by Kyle R. Spencer (in contrast to the two older Iris N. Spencer Poetry Awards by Kean W. Spencer), and is named after his mother-in-law.

The following are the winners of the Myong Cha Son Haiku Award:
2007  Luke Bauerlein
2008  Giaco Furino
2009  David J. Doyle
2010  Stephen Krewson
2011  Talia Lev
2012  Billy Lockhart
2013  Kasey Erin Phifer
2014  Yoon Hyuk Park

The runners-up were:
2007 
2008 
2009 
2010 
2011  
2012  Kasey Erin Phifer
2013  Therese O'Shaughnessy
2014

References

American poetry awards